Graham Duncan (born 2 February 1969) was a Scottish footballer who played for Dumbarton, Stranraer, Albion Rovers, Queen of the South and Queen's Park.

References

1969 births
Scottish footballers
Dumbarton F.C. players
Stranraer F.C. players
Albion Rovers F.C. players
Queen of the South F.C. players
Queen's Park F.C. players
Scottish Football League players
Living people
Association football forwards
Association football midfielders